Pāle Parish is an administrative unit of Limbaži Municipality (and previously Limbaži District), Latvia.

References 

Parishes of Latvia
Limbaži Municipality